Isaac B. Cameron (June 15, 1851 – October 11, 1930) was a Republican politician in the U.S. state of Ohio who was Ohio State Treasurer from 1900 to 1904.

Isaac Cameron was born in Nairn, Scotland in 1851. When he was an infant, his widowed mother moved with the family to a farm in Jefferson County, Ohio near Salineville. In 1855, the family moved to Salineville. Cameron attended public schools, and graduated from Iron City Business College of Pittsburgh. He acted as bookkeeper for a Lisbon firm until 1874, then was a partner and then sole proprietor of a business from 1880 to 1893.

In 1893, Cameron was elected Treasurer of Columbiana County, and re-elected in 1895. For about a year, in 1898, he was Receiver of the bankrupt First National Bank at Lisbon. In 1899, he was nominated by the Republicans for Ohio State Treasurer, and won election. He won re-election in 1901. After his second term, he was chosen as president of the Columbus Savings and Trust Company. He died October 11, 1930, and is interred at Green Lawn Cemetery, Columbus, Ohio

Cameron was a thirty-second degree Mason, a Knight Templar, a member of the I.O.O.F., a Knights of Pythias, and an Elk. In 1875, he married Laura A. Irwin of Cleveland, Ohio, and had a son, Roy MacDonald Cameron, born in 1883. He was a Presbyterian by faith.

Notes

References

State treasurers of Ohio
Ohio Republicans
People from Salineville, Ohio
1851 births
1930 deaths
Burials at Green Lawn Cemetery (Columbus, Ohio)
Scottish emigrants to the United States
Politicians from Columbus, Ohio
People from Nairn